
This is a list of AEW Dark episodes including episode number, location, venue and that night's main event.

All dates, venues and main events are per the official AEW YouTube channel.

2019

2020

2021

2022

2023

See also 
 List of AEW Dark: Elevation episodes
 List of AEW Dynamite episodes
 List of AEW Rampage episodes

References 

All Elite Wrestling lists
Lists of American non-fiction television series episodes